= Oskar Johannes Wirkhaus =

Estonian politician

Oskar Johannes Wirkhaus (13 November 1870 – 11 November 1920 Tartu) was an Estonian politician.

In 1920, he was Minister of Commerce and Industry.
